Kopaonik is a mountain range located in Serbia.

On the slopes of the mountain range there is a Kopaonik ski resort which is one of the largest in Southeast Europe. There are 25 ski lifts with capacity of 32,000 skiers per hour.

Geography 
It belongs to the region of Raška. The Kopaonik mountain massif (Kopaoničke planine) includes the mountains of Kopaonik, Željin, Goč and Stolovi.

Climate
Kopaonik has a subalpine climate (Köppen climate classification: Dfc) with fresh summers, and long, cold winters with abundant snowfall. The snow season lasts from November to April, while there are around 200 sunny days.

Earthquakes 
Kopaonik was hit 5 times by earthquakes of Mercalli intensity VII to VIII between 1978 and 1985. The 1983 earthquake had an intensity of VIII (Severe) and affected 7 villages, leaving 200 homeless, and 1,200 buildings and dwellings damaged.

Name 
Due to its rich mines, Kopaonik was originally named Silver Mountain and that name was also used by the Romans, Venetians and Ottomans. Its current name, originally Kopalnik, is also connected to the ore mining as it comes from kopati, Serbian for digging.

History 
Kopaonik has a rich historical heritage. Oldest findings are from the Paleolithic and already show that local people used metals. Localities include Bela Stena, Veliki Krš and Jasova Bačija. Neolithic remains were discovered on the localities of Gornji Kaznovići (Rosulja and Lug), Greblje, Tomovićko Brdo and the Neolithic range of Beglučka.

The mining fully developed during the Classical antiquity. The Romans began to dig the first proper mines and to build the surrounding settlements. The remains from this period include the archaeo-metallurgic complex Zajačak and the locality of Dobrinac in Rvati. Dobrinac originates from the 3rd or 4th century AD and it was the administrative center of the mining and metallurgic operations on the western slope of the mountain.

The area remained an important mining center in the Middle Ages and by the 14th century it became the main mining area of Serbia. Emperor Dušan visited the Silver Mountain in August 1336. In 1412 despot Stefan Lazarević granted the Law on mines which mentions the mines of gold, silver, iron, copper, lead and zinc in the area. By that time, the mountain already hosted the colonies of Saxons, Kotorans and Ragusians. Besides old churches and monasteries like Đurđevi stupovi, Studenica monastery, Sopoćani and Gradac Monastery, there are also several early and medieval fortresses locally, built by Serbian dynasties. The nearest Serbian medieval castle is Maglič.

During the Ottoman period, from the 15th century, the mining gradually ceased, but they developed the thermal springs, building Turkish baths. Remains of one are found in modern spa of Jošanička Banja.

First scientific exploration of the mountain's flora came in 1836-38 when the geologist Ami Boué visited the mountain. He made a collection of Kopaonik's plant life which is today kept in the Imperial Natural History Museum in Vienna. Botanist Josif Pančić gave the greatest scientific contribution to the plant life on Kopaonik. In 1851 he explored the mountain for the first time, followed by another 18 expeditions.

During World War II the Yugoslav Partisans were active in the region.

With territorial reorganization in the mid-1950s, the southern parts of Kopaonik were to be ceded from NR Serbia to its autonomous province Kosovo and Metohija. In 1959, Leposavić was incorporated into the province.

In Pančić's honor, marking the 100th anniversary of his first expedition, the highest point was renamed from Milan's Peak (Milanov vrh) to Pančić's Peak in 1951. A mausoleum was built on the peak and the remains of Pančić and his wife were reinterred in it. They were buried in the coffins made of Serbian spruce, which Pančić discovered.

National park

Geography 
In 1981, due to its location, climate, rich forests, variety of herbs, and area for holiday and recreation,  of the range were proclaimed a national park.

This central Kopaonik plateau is called Suvo Rudište. It is surrounded by mountain peaks. Directly below the Suvo Rudište plateau starts the valley of the Samokovska River, with its steep run, numerous rapids, falls and gorges. Kopaonik has over 200 sunny days annually and over 160 days covered by snow. There is also the Jelovarnik falls, one of the highest in Serbia.

Kopaonik has several excellent natural lookouts: Suvo Rudište, Gobelja, Karaman, Kukavica, Vučak and Treska. On a clear day, a distant mountains in Montenegro, Bulgaria and Albania can be observed.

There are 13 localities within the park which are declared strict nature reserves: Barska Reka, Bele Stene, Vučak, Gobelja, Duboka, Jankove Bare, Jelak, Jelovarnik, Kozje Stene, Mrkonje, Metođe, Samokovska Reka and Suvo Rudište. Under the 1st level of protection, it is the reserve of the mire ecosystem, especially of rare and endangered and endemic plants, amphibians and birds (peregrine falcon, common buzzard, common redstart).

Soil erosion is a threat as there is a lot of logging and deforestation in the park.

Wildlife

Plant life 

Kopaonik's flora has a large number of autochthonous plant species (Balkan beech, fir, spruce, yew, several kinds of maple, pine and oak). Deciduous forests and native coniferous woodland make up most of the forested land in the park. There are also forests of willow, poplar, common hornbeam, durmast oak and Turkey oak. In total, there are 1,600 plant species in the park, out of which 200 grow only on Kopaonik. It also includes over 200 species of fungi. Special value of Kopaonik in terms of biological diversity is that 11.9% of the high mountain endemic species in the Balkans inhabits the mountain. Endemic species which grow only on Kopaonik include Kopaonik's houseleek, Kopaonik's violet and Pančić's bittercress. Other endemites include sea thrift, Balkan docks (Rumex balcanicus), Pancicia serbica, Blečić's columbine (Aquilegia blecicii), Bosnian marsh orchid, Bulgarian achillea (Achillea bulgarica), Alyssum, aconite and Yugoslav bell (Edrianthus jugoslavicus).

There are several "botanical monuments" in the park. Those are trees which are very old, large in size and still vital. Among them are the fir "of the hundred elbows" in Samokovska Reka, a spruce in Gobeljska Reka and three mountain sycamores in Kriva Reka.

With several other beech localities in the national parks of Fruška Gora and Tara, beech forest Kozje Stene on Kopaonik have been submitted for the inclusion into the UNESCO World Heritage Site Ancient and Primeval Beech Forests of the Carpathians and Other Regions of Europe in May 2020. It was announced that the rules will be changed, so that parts of Kopaonik might be included in 2023.

Animal life 

The fauna is also diverse but its concentration varies, depending on the quality of the habitat.

An endemic butterfly, the Balkan postman, lives on the mountain.

Kopaonik has 175 species of birds, including the protected ones like woodpecker and thrush. Other species include rock partridge, scops owl, red-backed shrike and wood lark.

Major representatives of the mammalian fauna are wild boar and wild cat. After they went extinct on the mountain in 1856, 30 red deers were reintroduced in the Kukavica locality in 2021. It is part of the wider project of reintroducing red deer in the central parts of Serbia.

Transportation 
Kopaonik is well-connected with the main transport routes in Serbia. The central part of Kopaonik with the tourist center and ski slopes are linked with the Ibar highway, and the nearest international airport is in Niš. A public heliport is located in a military base half a mile north of the resort. in 2019, the longest artificial ski slope in Europe opened in the resort.

See also 
 Kopaonik (Raška), a village in the municipality of Raška, at Kopaonik Mountain
 Majdan (mountain in Kosovo)
 Pilatovica
 1983 Kopaonik earthquake

Notes

References

Sources

External links 

, British promotional video
 Kopaonik HopNaKop - Tourist Center
 National Park Kopaonik
 British site promotion of Kopaonik
 Kopaonik Ski Resort - news, photos, ski info, web cams, weather, accommodation, forum, impressions
 BirdLife Kopaonik factsheet
 Kopaonik Ski Mountain - ski info, live camera, news, last minute, weather forecast, skiing, snowboarding, booking accommodation

 
Protected areas established in 1981
National parks of Serbia
Mountains associated with Christian monasticism